Bebelis coenosa is a species of beetle in the family Cerambycidae. It was described by Bates in 1866.

References

Bebelis
Beetles described in 1866